Piet Bannenberg (3 January 1911 – 6 March 2002) was a Dutch swimmer. He competed in the men's 4 × 200 metre freestyle relay event at the 1928 Summer Olympics.

References

External links
 

1911 births
2002 deaths
Swimmers from Amsterdam
Olympic swimmers of the Netherlands
Swimmers at the 1928 Summer Olympics
Dutch male freestyle swimmers
20th-century Dutch people